Michael Haydn's Symphony No. 27 in B-flat major, Opus 1 No. 1, Perger 18, Sherman 27, MH 358, written in Salzburg in 1784, is the first of the B-flat major symphonies attributed to Joseph Haydn in Hoboken's catalog.

Scored for 2 oboes, 2 bassoons, 2 horns and strings, in three movements:

Grave - Allegro con spirito
Andante, in E-flat major
Presto

This symphony is the third of four by Michael Haydn to include a slow introduction before the first movement (the others are Symphonies Nos. 21, 22, and 30). All four were written between 1778 and 1785 and attached to symphonies cast in three movements (without minuets).

Discography

Included in a set of 20 symphonies on the CPO label with Bohdan Warchal conducting the Slovak Philharmonic; specifically, on disc 6 together with one of the other two Opus 1 symphonies. The BIS CD of the Helsinborg Symphony Orchestra conducted by Hans-Peter Frank instead pairs this symphony with Nos. 39, 34 and 30.

References
 A. Delarte, "A Quick Overview Of The Instrumental Music Of Michael Haydn" Bob's Poetry Magazine November 2006: 22 PDF
 Charles H. Sherman and T. Donley Thomas, Johann Michael Haydn (1737 - 1806), a chronological thematic catalogue of his works. Stuyvesant, New York: Pendragon Press (1993)
 C. Sherman, "Johann Michael Haydn" in The Symphony: Salzburg, Part 2 London: Garland Publishing (1982): lxviii

Symphony 27
Compositions in B-flat major
1784 compositions